The 2017 UEFA Women's Under-19 Championship qualifying competition was a women's under-19 football competition that determined the seven teams joining the automatically qualified hosts Northern Ireland in the 2017 UEFA Women's Under-19 Championship final tournament.

A total of 47 UEFA member national teams entered the qualifying competition. Players born on or after 1 January 1998 are eligible to participate.

Format
The qualifying competition consists of two rounds:
Qualifying round: Apart from France, England and Germany, which receive byes to the elite round as the teams with the highest seeding coefficient, the remaining 44 teams are drawn into 11 groups of four teams. Each group is played in single round-robin format at one of the teams selected as hosts after the draw. The 11 group winners and the 10 runners-up with the best record against the first and third-placed teams in their group advance to the elite round.
Elite round: The 24 teams are drawn into six groups of four teams. Each group is played in single round-robin format at one of the teams selected as hosts after the draw. The six group winners and the runner-up with the best record against the first and third-placed teams in their group qualify for the final tournament.

Tiebreakers
The teams are ranked according to points (3 points for a win, 1 point for a draw, 0 points for a loss). If two or more teams are equal on points on completion of a mini-tournament, the following tie-breaking criteria are applied, in the order given, to determine the rankings (Regulations Articles 14.01 and 14.02):
Higher number of points obtained in the mini-tournament matches played among the teams in question;
Superior goal difference resulting from the mini-tournament matches played among the teams in question;
Higher number of goals scored in the mini-tournament matches played among the teams in question;
If, after having applied criteria 1 to 3, teams still have an equal ranking, criteria 1 to 3 are reapplied exclusively to the mini-tournament matches between the teams in question to determine their final rankings. If this procedure does not lead to a decision, criteria 5 to 9 apply;
Superior goal difference in all mini-tournament matches;
Higher number of goals scored in all mini-tournament matches;
If only two teams have the same number of points, and they are tied according to criteria 1 to 6 after having met in the last round of the mini-tournament, their rankings are determined by a penalty shoot-out (not used if more than two teams have the same number of points, or if their rankings are not relevant for qualification for the next stage).
Lower disciplinary points total based only on yellow and red cards received in the mini-tournament matches (red card = 3 points, yellow card = 1 point, expulsion for two yellow cards in one match = 3 points);
Higher position in the coefficient ranking list used for the qualifying round draw;
Drawing of lots.

To determine the ten best runners-up from the qualifying round and the best runner-up from the elite round, the results against the teams in fourth place are discarded. The following criteria are applied (Regulations Article 15.01):
Higher number of points;
Superior goal difference;
Higher number of goals scored;
Lower disciplinary points total based only on yellow and red cards received (red card = 3 points, yellow card = 1 point, expulsion for two yellow cards in one match = 3 points);
Higher position in the coefficient ranking list used for the qualifying round draw;
Drawing of lots.

Qualifying round

Draw
The draw for the qualifying round was held on 13 November 2015, 09:55 CET (UTC+1), at the UEFA headquarters in Nyon, Switzerland.

The teams were seeded according to their coefficient ranking, calculated based on the following:
2013 UEFA Women's Under-19 Championship final tournament and qualifying competition (qualifying round and elite round)
2014 UEFA Women's Under-19 Championship final tournament and qualifying competition (qualifying round and elite round)
2015 UEFA Women's Under-19 Championship final tournament and qualifying competition (qualifying round and elite round)

Each group contained one team from Pot A, one team from Pot B, one team from Pot C, and one team from Pot D. For political reasons, Armenia and Azerbaijan (due to the disputed status of Nagorno-Karabakh), as well as Russia and Ukraine (due to the Russian military intervention in Ukraine), could not be drawn in the same group.

Notes
Teams marked in bold have qualified for the final tournament.

Groups
The qualifying round must be played on the following FIFA International Match Calendar dates unless all four teams agree to play on another date:
12–20 September 2016
17–25 October 2016

All times are CEST (UTC+2).

Group 1

Group 2

Group 3

Group 4

The Serbia v Scotland match was not played as scheduled due to illness within the Scotland squad. The match was awarded by UEFA as a 3–0 win for Serbia due to Scotland's "refusal to play" the match.

Group 5

Group 6

Group 7

Group 8

Group 9

The Croatia v Czech Republic match was completed with a 0–7 scoreline before a default victory was awarded.

Group 10

Group 11

Ranking of second-placed teams
To determine the ten best second-placed teams from the qualifying round which advance to the elite round, only the results of the second-placed teams against the first and third-placed teams in their group are taken into account.

Elite round

Draw
The draw for the elite round was held on 11 November 2016, 11:00 CET (UTC+1), at the UEFA headquarters in Nyon, Switzerland.

The teams were seeded according to their results in the qualifying round. France, England and Germany, which received byes to the elite round, were automatically seeded into Pot A. Each group contained one team from Pot A, one team from Pot B, one team from Pot C, and one team from Pot D. Teams from the same qualifying round group could not be drawn in the same group.

Groups
The elite round must be played on the following FIFA International Match Calendar dates unless all four teams agree to play on another date:
3–11 April 2017
5–13 June 2017

All times are CEST (UTC+2).

Group 1

The Belgium v Russia match was completed with a 3–0 scoreline before a default victory was awarded.

Group 2

Group 3

Group 4

Group 5

Group 6

Ranking of second-placed teams
To determine the best second-placed team from the elite round which qualify for the final tournament, only the results of the second-placed teams against the first and third-placed teams in their group are taken into account.

Qualified teams
The following eight teams qualify for the final tournament.

1 Bold indicates champion for that year. Italic indicates host for that year.

Top goalscorers
The following players scored four goals or more in the qualifying competition:

11 goals

 Lucía García

10 goals

 Erin Cuthbert

7 goals

 Celien Guns
 Juuli Ketola
 Emmaliina Tulkki

6 goals

 Agla María Albertsdóttir
 Leanne Kiernan

5 goals

 Kamila Dubcová
 Caroline Møller
 Jutta Rantala
 Sofia Del Stabile
 Quinty Sabajo
 Joëlle Smits
 Andrea Norheim
 Carla Boyce
 Aitana Bonmatí
 Alisha Lehmann

4 goals

 Elena Dhont
 Denisa Skálová
 Signe Bruun
 Mille Gejl
 Maria Hovmark
 Laura Freigang
 Giulia Gwinn
 Anna Pétursdóttir
 Tijana Filipović
 Miljana Ivanović
 Patricia Guijarro
 Maite Oroz
 Naomi Mégroz
 Camille Surdez

References

External links

Qualification
2017
2016 in women's association football
2017 in women's association football
2016 in youth association football
2017 in youth association football